The Belgian Figure Skating Championships are the figure skating national championship held annually to determine the national champions of Belgium. Skaters compete in the disciplines of men's singles, ladies' singles, ice dancing, and synchronized skating, although not every discipline is held every year due to a lack of participants. The event is organized by Fédération Royale Belge de Patinage Artistique, the sport's national governing body.

Senior medalists

Men

Ladies

Pairs

Synchronized skating

Junior medalists

Men

Ladies

Advanced novice medalists

Men

Ladies

References

External links
 Skate Belgium
 Federation Royale Belge de Patinage Artistique
 
 
 
 
 
 

 
Figure skating national championships
Figure skating in Belgium
Figure Skating